The Moss Braes are west-facing slopes (braes) situated west of Robin Peak on Signy Island, in the South Orkney Islands off Antarctica. They were named by the UK Antarctic Place-Names Committee in 1990 from the extensive moss banks on the dissected rocky slopes.

References

Hills of the South Orkney Islands